The SMUD Headquarters Building is the Sacramento Municipal Utility District headquarters. It is located at 6201 S Street in Sacramento, California.

Architecture
The 166,000 square-foot building was designed in the Modernist style by Dreyfuss & Blackford Architects in 1959. Construction was completed in 1961. It is influenced by the work of Mies van der Rohe.

The building has adjustable aluminum louvers that are used to control the temperature and lighting in and of the building. The exterior also features a tile mural by internationally-known artist Wayne Thiebaud called Water City, which serves as a tribute to the Sacramento and American Rivers.

The SMUD Headquarters Building was listed on the National Register of Historic Places in 2010.

See also
History of Sacramento, California
California Historical Landmarks in Sacramento County, California
National Register of Historic Places listings in Sacramento County, California

References

External links

Buildings and structures in Sacramento, California
Sacramento Municipal Utility District
Office buildings completed in 1959
Commercial buildings on the National Register of Historic Places in California
National Register of Historic Places in Sacramento, California
1959 in California
Modernist architecture in California